Battle of Havana may refer to:

Battle of Havana (1748), a naval engagement between the Great Britain and Spain during the War of Jenkins' Ear, resulting in a tactical British victory
the Siege of Havana, a British expedition to capture Havana during the Seven Years' War, resulting in a decisive British victory
Battle of Havana (1870), a naval engagement between a Prussian gunboat and a French aviso during the Franco-Prussian War, ending inconclusively